The 2021–22 season was Liverpool Football Club's 130th season in existence and their 60th consecutive season in the top flight of English football. During the season, Liverpool won the EFL Cup for the ninth time in their history, a tournament record, and the FA Cup for the eighth time in their history. In spite of fixture congestion, Liverpool participated in every game they were eligible to play throughout the 2021–22 season, as they competed for both the Premier League and Champions League titles, ultimately finishing second in the Premier League, just a point behind Manchester City, and losing the Champions League final to Real Madrid 0–1.

First-team squad
As of 28 May 2022

New contracts

Transfers

Transfers in

Transfers out

Loans out

Transfer summary

Spending

Summer:  £ 36,000,000

Winter:  £ 37,500,000

Total:  £ 73,500,000

Income

Summer:  £ 45,050,000

Winter:  £ 1,500,000

Total:  £ 46,550,000

Net Expenditure

Summer:  £ 9,050,000

Winter:  £ 36,000,000

Total:  £ 26,950,000

Pre-season and friendlies
On 12 July 2021, Liverpool announced that they would play four friendlies as part of a pre-season training camp in Austria. On 19 July, they stated that they would complete their pre-season campaign with two home friendlies. On 29 July, the Reds confirmed that they would face Bologna in two sixty-minute matches as part of a training camp in France in between the previously announced engagements.

Competitions

Overview

Premier League

League table

Results summary

Results by matchday

Matches
The league fixtures were revealed on 16 June 2021.

FA Cup

Liverpool were drawn at home to Shrewsbury Town in the third round to begin their participation in the competition.

EFL Cup

Liverpool entered the competition in the third round.

UEFA Champions League

Liverpool entered the competition in the group stage.

Group stage

The draw for the group stage was held on 26 August 2021, with the fixtures announced a day later.

Knockout phase

Round of 16
The draw for the round of 16 took place on 13 December 2021 at UEFA's headquarters in Nyon, Switzerland. Liverpool were drawn against Serie A champions Inter Milan.

Quarter-finals
The draw for the quarter-finals was held on 18 March 2022.

Semi-finals
The draw for the semi-finals was held on 18 March 2022, after the quarter-final draw.

Final
The final was held on 28 May 2022 between Liverpool and Real Madrid. This was Liverpool's tenth European Cup Final appearance, the most of any English club, and third appearance in the final in five years; it was a rematch of the 2018 final, which Liverpool lost 1–3.

Squad statistics

Appearances
Players with no appearances are not included on the list.

Goals

Assists

Clean sheets

Disciplinary record

Club awards

End-of-season awards

Standard Chartered Men's Player of the Season: Mohamed Salah
Goal of the Season: Mohamed Salah (vs. Man City, 3 October 2021)

Player of the Month award

Awarded monthly to the player that was chosen by fans voting on Liverpoolfc.com

See also
 2021–22 in English football
 List of Liverpool F.C. seasons

References

External links

Liverpool F.C. seasons
Liverpool F.C.
Liverpool F.C.